Edgbarrow may refer to:

Edgbarrow School, a secondary comprehensive school in Crowthorne, Berkshire, England
Edgbarrow Woods, woods situated between Sandhurst and Crowthorne, Berkshire, England